Lunahuaná is a district in the middle Cañete Province in Peru. It is bordered by Imperial District on the west, San Vicente de Cañete District on the north,  Pacarán District on the east, and Chincha Province on the south.

See also 
 Inka Wasi

External links
  Municipalidad Distrital de Lunahuaná
  Lunahuaná Tour